Julio César Trujillo Vásquez (25 March 1931 – 19 May 2019) was an Ecuadorian lawyer and politician. Born in Ibarra, he served as a member of the National Congress from 1979 to 1984. Described by Forbes as "reshaping the landscape of Ecuadorian politics," Trujillo was a presidential candidate of the Popular Democracy-Christian Democratic Union during the 1984 general election, receiving a total of 103,790 (4.7%) votes. He died in office in 2019.

On 19 May 2019, Trujillo died at a Quito hospital of complications caused by the intracerebral haemorrhage he suffered five days prior. He was 88. On the death of Trujillo, President Lenín Moreno said in a statement "We have lost a true leader, a man who helped give the country's government back to the people."

References

1931 births
2019 deaths
20th-century Ecuadorian lawyers
21st-century Ecuadorian lawyers
20th-century Ecuadorian politicians
21st-century Ecuadorian politicians
Christian Democratic Union (Ecuador) politicians
Members of the National Congress (Ecuador)